Desmond Hallimond Fawcett (January quarter 1905 – 24 October 1968) was an English professional footballer who played as a goalkeeper. He played over 300 matches in the Football League for six different clubs.

References

1905 births
1968 deaths
English footballers
Association football goalkeepers
Middlesbrough F.C. players
Loftus Albion F.C. players
Darlington F.C. players
Nelson F.C. players
Preston North End F.C. players
York City F.C. players
Mansfield Town F.C. players
Rochdale A.F.C. players
Telford United F.C. players
English Football League players